The Arlanza River rises in the Sierra de la Demanda, near Quintanar de la Sierra in an area known as Fuente Sanza. As it flows through the province of Burgos, Spain, it passes through the municipalities of Castrovido, Salas de los Infantes, Covarrubias and Lerma, broadly east to west roughly parallel to and north of the River Duero.

Its main tributary is the River Arlanzón that joins near Quintana del Puente shortly before the Arlanza itself joins River Pisuerga which in turn joins the Duero.

It gives its name to the Arlanza wine region, a Spanish Denominación de Origen.

References

Rivers of Spain
Rivers of Burgos
Rivers of Palencia
Tributaries of the Pisuerga